The 2004–05 season was FC Dinamo București's 56th season in Liga I. For the 2004–05 season Dinamo's ambitions grew, but still many players left the club. Dinamo played a thrilling game vs. Manchester United in Bucharest in the third qualification round of the UEFA Champions League, but lost 1–2. This game was significant because it showed considerable progress from the last attempts to qualify for the group phase of the Champions League. The second leg was lost at Old Trafford 3–0. In the UEFA Cup 2004–05 season Dinamo was eliminated by Partizan Belgrade.

This time Dinamo had a better evolution during the season after the title victory. However, Dinamo lost the title to Steaua Bucharest on a costly error by Lucian Goian in the last seconds of the game with Rapid Bucharest close to the end of the season.

Dinamo won the Romanian Cup for the 12th time in history.

Results

UEFA Champions League 

Second qualifying round

Dinamo București won 2–0 on aggregate.

Third qualifying round

Manchester United won 5-1 on aggregate.

UEFA Cup 

First round

Partizan won 3-1 on aggregate.

Squad 

Goalkeepers: Vladimir Gaev (12/0), Cristian Munteanu (6/0), Bogdan Stelea (13/0).

Defenders: Angelo Alistar (18/0), Ionuţ Bălan (14/1), Ovidiu Burcă (14/0), Liviu Ciobotariu (8/0), George Galamaz (22/0), Lucian Goian (6/0), Alin Ilin (2/0), Adrian Iordache (14/1), Cristian Irimia (11/0), Cristian Pulhac (11/2), Ştefan Radu (2/0), Dorin Semeghin (16/0), Gabriel Tamaș (13/0).

Midfielders: Ionuț Badea (18/0), Adrian Cristea (10/0), Ştefan Grigorie (25/10), Andrei Mărgăritescu (29/2), Vlad Munteanu (4/0), Leonard Naidin (1/0), Alexandru Păcurar (14/1), Florentin Petre (24/2), Dennis Şerban (3/0), Iulian Tameş (11/0).

Forwards: Alexandru Bălţoi (18/3), Ionel Dănciulescu (15/11), Claudiu Drăgan (2/0), Adrian Mihalcea (17/1), Tibor Moldovan (5/1), Claudiu Niculescu (28/21), Ianis Zicu (13/3).

Transfers 

New players: Summer break - Matache (Metalul Plopeni), Galamaz (Rapid București), Irimia (Rapid București), Ciobotariu (Royal Antwerp), Onuț, Bălan and Bălțoi (Farul Constanța), Goian (Ceahlăul Piatra-Neamț), Mărgăritescu (Unirea Focșani), Păcurar (Universitatea Cluj-Napoca), D.Șerban (Petrolul Ploiești)

Winter break - Tamaș (Spartak Moskva), Ad.Cristea (Politehnica Iași), T.Moldovan (Apulum Alba-Iulia), Zicu (AC Parma)

Left team: Summer break - Șt.Preda (FC Argeș Pitești), Alexa (Beijing Guan), Bărcăuan (Shakhtar Donetsk), Onuț (Politehnica Iași), Cr.Ciubotariu (Politehnica Iași), Perenyi (Politehnica Iași)

Winter break - Cr.Munteanu (FC Național București), Cr.Irimia (Dinamo Kyiv), Naidin (Poli Timișoara), D.Șerban (Larissa), Vl.Munteanu (FC Național București), Tameș (Alania Vladikavkaz), Cl.Drăgan (Universitatea Craiova), Dănciulescu (Shandong Luneng Taishan), Cigan (Liberty Salonta)

External links 
 www.labtof.ro
 www.romaniansoccer.ro
 worldfootball.net

FC Dinamo București seasons
Dinamo Bucuresti